Gothenburg Municipality (Göteborgs kommun or Göteborgs stad) is a municipality in Västra Götaland County in western Sweden. Its seat is located in the city of Gothenburg.

When the first Swedish local government acts were implemented in 1863 the City of Gothenburg, founded and chartered in 1621, became a city municipality with an elected city council (stadsfullmäktige). Its territory has since then been added through amalgamations in 1868, 1906, 1922, 1931, 1945, 1948, 1967 and 1974. The local government reform of 1971 made the city a unitary municipality, like all others in the country. The municipality prefers, however, to style itself Göteborgs stad (City of Göteborg), whenever legally possible.

In March 2018 it was reported that the municipality and municipality-owned companies had 236 employees working with public relations (Swedish: kommunikation), more than Stockholm, to a cost of 400 000 SEK daily or 151 million SEK annually.

Localities
The major part of the Gothenburg urban area (Göteborgs tätort) is situated within the municipality, but there are also some other localities as well as rural areas.
Billdal (part of)
Donsö
Hjuvik
Nolvik
Olofstorp
Styrsö
Torslanda
Vrångö

Boroughs

In 1990 the municipality was subdivided into 21 stadsdelsnämnder (district boards), sometimes translated to boroughs, which they really are not. In 2009 the two district boards of Frölunda and Högsbo were joined together. It has been decided that from the start of 2011 many more will be joined together leaving 10 new district boards.

The boards carry responsibility for primary school, social, leisure, and cultural services within their respective areas. In the election of 1998 three boroughs (Askim, Torslanda and Älvsborg) held local referendums on forming their own municipalities, but their petitions were rejected by the government of Sweden.

Boroughs:

Politics and government
The municipality has a municipal assembly (kommunfullmäktige), consisting of 81 members, elected for four years. There are nine political parties represented in the council elected in 2022:

After the 2022 election it was clear that the governing Alliance could not rule any longer with them winning only 27 seats in the chamber. Soon after the election the Centre Party announced they were starting negotiations with the Social Democrats (S), Left Party (V) and the Green Party (MP) about forming a majority coalition that could rule the city for the next four years. These negotiations broke down but S, V and MP could still take the power despite being a minority with only 40 out of 81 seats since C continues to refuse cooperation with the Sweden Democrats (SD).

There were ten political parties represented in the council elected in 2018: 

Following the 2018 municipal elections, neither traditional coalition of parties (the Alliance and the Red-Greens) was able to obtain a majority in the municipal assembly. The newly-formed Democrats party, whose primary campaign promise is to stop the construction of the West Link, obtained 14 seats in the assembly, making it the second-largest party. The Green Party and the Left Party announced on 6 November that they would draft their own municipal budget together, along with Feminist Initiative - thus abandoning their traditional cooperation with the Social Democrats. This has been recognized as the three parties forming a local political alliance which has been referred to as the Red-green-pink coalition. As a result of this the Alliance were able to take the power in Gothenburg for the first time in nearly 30 years.

The municipal executive committee (kommunstyrelsen) has 13 members, representing the six parties from the two major political coalitions who have seats in the assembly.

The chairwoman of the municipal assembly is Åse-Lill Törnquist (MP) and the chairman of the municipal executive committee (sometimes titled mayor) is Axel Josefson from the Moderate Party.

List of mayors 

Sören Mannheimer, (Social Democrats) 1985-1988
Göran Johansson, (Social Democrats) 1988–1991
Johnny Magnusson (Moderate Party), 1991–1994
Göran Johansson (Social Democrats), 1994–2009
Anneli Hulthén (Social Democrats), 2009–2016
Ann-Sofie Hermansson (Social Democrats), 2016–2018
Axel Josefson (Moderate Party), 2018–2022
Jonas Attenius (Social Democrats), 2022–

International cooperation
Twin towns:
 Bergen, Norway
 Turku, Finland
 Aarhus, Denmark
Partner cities:
 Nelson Mandela Bay, South Africa
 Lyon, France

The cooperation with the South African Nelson Mandela Bay Metropolitan Municipality (established in 1998) is a partnership fostering development of common fields of interest such as solid waste management, public libraries, sport and tourism.
Gothenburg had signed an agreement with Shanghai in 1986 which was upgraded in 2003 to include exchanges in culture, economics, trade and sport. However, the agreement was allowed to lapse in 2020.

Sister cities:
 Chicago, United States (since 1987)
 Kraków, Poland
 Tallinn, Estonia
 Rostock, Germany
Regional:
 Oslo, Norway

See also
 Gothenburg
 Gothenburg Law Court

References

External links

goteborg.se - Official site for city of Gothenburg (in Swedish)
goteborg.se/english - Official web page for short English description of the content in city of Gothenburg site 
international.goteborg.se - Official international site for city of Gothenburg

 
Municipalities of Västra Götaland County
Gothenburg
Articles with dead external links from July 2017